The 2014–15 Towson Tigers men's basketball team represented Towson University during the 2014–15 NCAA Division I men's basketball season. The Tigers, led by fourth year head coach Pat Skerry, played their home games at SECU Arena and were members of the Colonial Athletic Association. They finished the season 12–20, 5–13 in CAA play to finish in ninth place. They lost in the first round of the CAA tournament to Elon.

Previous season 
The Tigers finished the season 25–11, 13–3 in CAA play to finish in second place. They advanced to the semifinals of the CAA tournament where they lost to William & Mary. They were invited to the CollegeInsider.com Tournament where they defeated USC Upstate and East Tennessee State to advance to the quarterfinals where they lost to Murray State.

Departures

Incoming Transfers

Recruiting

Roster

Schedule

|-
!colspan=9 style="background:#000000; color:#FFD600;"| Exhibition

|-
!colspan=9 style="background:#000000; color:#FFD600;"| Regular season

|-
!colspan=9 style="background:#000000; color:#FFD600;"| CAA tournament

See also
2014–15 Towson Tigers women's basketball team

References

Towson Tigers men's basketball seasons
Towson